Roger Chickering is an American historian of the German Empire and World War I. He was a professor at Georgetown University, retiring in 2010.

Education
Chickering received his doctorate in 1968 at Stanford University, where he studied with Gordon A. Craig. Imperial Germany and a World Without War: The Peace Movement and German Society, 1892-1914, published in 1975, was based on his dissertation.

Career
 Professor of History, BMW Center for German and European Studies (Joint Appointment in the Department of History), Georgetown University, 1993-2010
 Research Fellow, Wissenschaftskolleg zu Berlin, 2008-2009
 Research Fellow, National Humanities Center, Research Triangle Park, NC
 Research Fellow, Woodrow Wilson International Center for Scholars, Washington, DC, 1996–97
 Professor of History, University of Oregon, 1981–94
 Visiting Research Fellow, Militärgeschichtliches Forschungsamt, Freiburg i. Br., 1991–92
 Member, School of Historical Studies, Institute for Advanced Study, Princeton, New Jersey, Spring Semester 1991
 Visiting Research Fellow, Institut für neuere Geschichte, Ludwig-Maximilians-Universität, Munich, 1984–85  
 Visiting Research Fellow, Friedrich-Meinecke Institut, Free University of Berlin, 1976–77
 Associate Professor of History, University of Oregon, 1974–81
 Assistant Professor of History, University of Oregon, 1968–74
 Instructor of History, Stanford University, 1967–68

Chickering retired from Georgetown University in 2010. While he began his career as a historian focusing on the German Empire, his interests increasingly migrated to the First World War. During his career, he published multiple monographs, edited volumes, and articles.

Selected publications

Freiburg im Ersten Weltkrieg: Totaler Krieg und städtischer Alltag 1914-1918. Schoeningh Verlag, 2009.
The Great War and Urban Life in Germany: Freiburg, 1914-1918.  Cambridge UP, 2007.

Imperial Germany and the Great War, 1914-1918. 2d ed. Cambridge UP, 2004
Karl Lamprecht: A German Academic Life (1856-1915). New Jersey: Humanities Press, 1993.
 Karl Lamprecht. Leben eines deutschen Historikers 1856-1915] Stuttgart: Franz Steiner Verlag, 2021.
We Men Who Feel Most German: A Cultural Study of the Pan-German League, 1886-1914. Boston: Allen & Unwin, 1984.
Imperial Germany and a World Without War: The Peace Movement and German Society, 1892-1914. Princeton, N.J: Princeton University Press, 1975.
"The Reichsbanner and the Weimar Republic, 1924-26," The Journal of Modern History Vol. 40, No. 4, December 1968.

Endnotes

 

1944 births
American military historians
American male non-fiction writers
Living people